Prevail Health Solutions is a Chicago-based health care technology company that created a system for online delivery of evidence-based mental health care. The company aims to create greater access to cost-effective therapy for those who have difficulty seeking and receiving adequate treatment.

Prevail was founded in January 2008 by Richard Gengler, then an MBA student at the University of Chicago. It was born out of the need to provide effective and accessible mental health care to the growing number of veterans  returning from Iraq and Afghanistan. Gengler, a former US Navy pilot, leveraged his background to create a unique delivery model to bring mental health treatment to returning troops.

Prevail has received grants from the National Science Foundation’s Small Business Innovation Research Program. Additionally, the McCormick Foundation has supported this effort to help returning veterans through a grant to the Veterans' Corporation. Prevail was also awarded a contract through the Veterans Health Administration to deliver mental health care through its online platform.

Products & Services
Prevail's first program, Vetsprevail, is an online behavioral health program designed to assist veterans of Operation Enduring Freedom and Operation Iraqi Freedom readjust to life after deployment. Prevail has expanded its products to include iPrevail, Moms Prevail, Students Prevail, Warriors Prevail, and Warriors Prevail Family.

References

Companies based in Chicago
Health care companies based in Illinois